Elachista cursa is a moth of the family Elachistidae. It is found in the Big Desert in Victoria, Australia.

The wingspan is about 9.4 mm for males. The forewings are bluish white. The hindwings are brownish grey.

References

Moths described in 2011
cursa
Moths of Australia
Taxa named by Lauri Kaila